Sir Leonard Joseph Knowles, CBE (15 March 1916 – 23 September 1999) was the first Chief Justice of the Bahamas of an independent Bahamas.

Knowles was born in Nassau, Bahamas, and was educated at Queen's College, Nassau before going to King's College London where he took an LLB in law in 1937. In 1935, he joined Gray's Inn in London and was called to the bar in 1939. 

He was the President of the Senate of the Bahamas from 1964 to 1972. In 1973, he became the first Chief Justice in the newly independent Bahamas, a position he held until 1978. He had to be sworn in before the Bahamian Independence Day (10 July 1973) because it was his duty to swear in the first prime minister. He was made CBE in 1963, and Knight Bachelor in the Queen's 1974 Birthday Honours.

After his retirement, he moved to the United States to live with his son in Macon, Georgia. He died on 23 September 1999 and is buried at the Riverside Cemetery in Macon.

References

1916 births
1999 deaths
Alumni of King's College London
Chief justices of the Bahamas
Knights Bachelor
Commanders of the Order of the British Empire
People from Nassau, Bahamas
Bahamian emigrants to the United States
Presidents of the Senate of the Bahamas